Alpine is an unincorporated community and former census-designated place in the North Slope Borough of Alaska within the  National Petroleum Reserve-Alaska on native lands. The population was 0 at the 2000 United States Census, but it was not included in the 2010 census.

Alpine is the site of a major oil drilling operation by ConocoPhillips, producing since 2000 with a peak in November 2005, further expansion in 2015 to build CD-5 and oil wells in Greater Mooses Tooth Unit 1 and 2. The infrastructure of Greater Mooses Tooth unit with pipelines, roads and mudplants to be used by the much larger Willow project located further West in the Bear Tooth Unit. Alpine is staffed primarily by commuter residents of Nuiqsut working a two-week on and two week off work schedule.

Geography
It is located 8 miles north of Nuiqsut, Alaska.

Transportation 
The area is served by the Alpine Airstrip. The closest commercial airport is at Deadhorse.

Demographics

Alpine first appeared as a census-designated place (CDP) in 2000, but did not report any residents. As of the censusof 2000 there were no permanent people living in the CDP, but approximately 250 workers in the work camp. Its status as a CDP was abolished as of the 2010 census.

Oil production
Discovered in 1994 and declared commercial in 1996, the Alpine Oil Pool was the largest oil field discovered in the US in over a decade. Development drilling began in 1998, and nine facilities modules were delivered to the North Slope via sealift during July 1999. Regular production began in November 2000. 
The Alpine Oil Pool produced an average of 97,485 BOPD during 2003 and 98,895 BOPD in 2004. Major upgrades were undertaken in 2004 to the water handling capacity and in 2005 to the oil handling, seawater injection and gas handling capacity. Since that peak, production from the pool has declined, despite continued development drilling operations and stood at an average of  during first six months of 2019.

CD-5
In the fourth quarter of 2015, oil production from a new "CD-5" drill on-pad site began, located to access both the Nanuq Kuparuk and the Alpine participating areas. It is part of the Colville River Unit, operated by ConocoPhillips Alaska, Inc. (78%) and a subsidiary of Anadarko Petroleum Corporation (22%). The CD-5 site became the first commercial oil development on Alaska Native lands within the boundaries of the  National Petroleum Reserve-Alaska on land owned by "Kuukpik Corporation", the village corporation for Nuiqsut, with subsurface rights owned by Arctic Slope Regional Corporation. The CD-5 project has 33 wells, includes a 6 mile road, four bridges, 32 miles of pipelines and electrical infrastructure and cost more than $1 billion. Oil from CD-5 is processed in Alpine, then flows through Kuparuk to the Trans-Alaska Pipeline System. 
Alpine field production gradually increased, averaging 54,720 barrels per day in February, up from 53,007 barrels per day in January and 50,389 barrels per day year over year, from February 2021.
In 2016, Conoco Phillips planned more wells.

Greater Mooses Tooth Unit 1 and 2
In 2015, the Bureau of Land Management (BLM) permitted this satellite project in Greater Mooses Tooth area, west of the Colville River delta, also on lands owned by Kuukpik Corporation. In 2017, two bridges were constructed, one to carry a drilling ridge, the other to carry drill rig module. First oil was expected in late 2018.

The Greater Mooses Tooth unit 2 was planned for 48 wells, cost to exceed $1 billion with first oil expected between late-2020 and 2021.

The infrastructure of Greater Mooses Tooth unit is to be used by the much larger Willow project located further West in the Bear Tooth Unit.

Climate

References

External links

 Alpine at the Community Database Online from the Alaska Division of Community and Regional Affairs
 Maps from the Alaska Department of Labor and Workforce Development: 2000
 National Geographic visits Alaska's North Slope

Former census-designated places in Alaska
Populated coastal places in Alaska on the Arctic Ocean
Populated places of the Arctic United States
Road-inaccessible communities of Alaska
Unincorporated communities in North Slope Borough, Alaska
Environmental controversies
Environmental impact of the petroleum industry
Environment of Alaska
Geography of North Slope Borough, Alaska
Industry in the Arctic
Native American history of Alaska
Oil fields in Alaska
Petroleum in Alaska